The Castle of St John, also known as Stranraer Castle, is an early 16th-century L-plan tower house in the centre of Stranraer, in Dumfries and Galloway, southwest Scotland. It was built by the Adairs of Kilhilt (who originally came from Ireland) c.1510. It has been used as a home, a court, a police station and as a military garrison during the "Killing Times" of Covenanter persecution in the 1680s. During the Victorian era, the castle was modified to serve as a prison, and it was used as an ARP base during the Second World War. The castle was refurbished in the late 1980s and is now a museum.

References

External links
Castle of St John - official site

St. John
Castles in Wigtownshire
Category A listed buildings in Dumfries and Galloway
Listed castles in Scotland
Listed prison buildings in Scotland
Museums in Dumfries and Galloway
History museums in Scotland
Prison museums in the United Kingdom
Defunct prisons in Scotland
Military and war museums in England
Stranraer
Tower houses in Scotland